General Bradford may refer to:

Roland Bradford (1892–1917), British Army brigadier general
Thomas Bradford (1777–1853), British Army lieutenant general
Wilmot Henry Bradford (1815–1914), British Army lieutenant general